In spectral graph theory, the Alon–Boppana bound provides a lower bound on the second-largest eigenvalue of the adjacency matrix of a -regular graph, meaning a graph in which every vertex has degree . The reason for the interest in the second-largest eigenvalue is that the largest eigenvalue is guaranteed to be  due to -regularity, with the all-ones vector being the associated eigenvector. The graphs that come close to meeting this bound are Ramanujan graphs, which are examples of the best possible expander graphs.

Its discoverers are Noga Alon and Ravi Boppana.

Theorem statement
Let  be a -regular graph on  vertices with diameter , and let  be its adjacency matrix. Let  be its eigenvalues. Then

The above statement is the original one proved by Noga Alon. Some slightly weaker variants exist to improve the ease of proof or improve intuition. Two of these are shown in the proofs below.

Intuition

The intuition for the number  comes from considering the infinite -regular tree. This graph is a universal cover of -regular graphs, and it has spectral radius

Saturation
A graph that essentially saturates the Alon–Boppana bound is called a Ramanujan graph. More precisely, a Ramanujan graph is a -regular graph such that 

This means that a random -vertex -regular graph is typically "almost Ramanujan."

First proof (slightly weaker statement)
We will prove a slightly weaker statement, namely dropping the specificity on the second term and simply asserting  Here, the  term refers to the asymptotic behavior as  grows without bound while  remains fixed.

Let the vertex set be  By the min-max theorem, it suffices to construct a nonzero vector  such that  and 

Pick some value  For each vertex in  define a vector  as follows. Each component will be indexed by a vertex  in the graph.

To prove this, let  denote the set of all vertices that have a distance of exactly  from  First, note that

Second, note that

where the last term on the right comes from a possible overcounting of terms in the initial expression. The above then implies

which, when combined with the fact that  for any  yields

The combination of the above results proves the desired inequality.

For convenience, define the -ball of a vertex  to be the set of vertices with a distance of at most  from  Notice that the entry of  corresponding to a vertex  is nonzero if and only if  lies in the -ball of 

The number of vertices within distance  of a given vertex is at most  Therefore, if  then there exist vertices  with distance at least 

Let  and  It then follows that  because there is no vertex that lies in the -balls of both  and  It is also true that  because no vertex in the -ball of  can be adjacent to a vertex in the -ball of 

Now, there exists some constant  such that  satisfies  Then, since 

Finally, letting  grow without bound while ensuring that  (this can be done by letting  grow sublogarithmically as a function of ) makes the error term  in

Second proof (slightly modified statement)

This proof will demonstrate a slightly modified result, but it provides better intuition for the source of the number  Rather than showing that  we will show that 

First, pick some value  Notice that the number of closed walks of length  is

However, it is also true that the number of closed walks of length  starting at a fixed vertex  in a -regular graph is at least the number of such walks in an infinite -regular tree, because an infinite -regular tree can be used to cover the graph. By the definition of the Catalan numbers, this number is at least  where  is the  Catalan number.

It follows that

Letting  grow without bound and letting  grow without bound but sublogarithmically in  yields

References 

Algebraic graph theory
Spectral theory